John William Atherton (October 17, 1916 – October 30, 2001) was an American poet, professor, and the founding president of Pitzer College.

Early life and education
John William Atherton was born in Minneapolis, Minnesota, the son of George R. Atherton.

Atherton began his academic career at Iowa State College, but left to serve as a torpedo and gunnery officer in the United States Navy during World War II.

He earned his bachelor’s degree in English from Amherst College and master’s and doctoral degrees in literature from the University of Chicago.

Career 
Active in the United States Naval Reserve for many years, he studied Russian in the Navy School of Oriental Language at Boulder, Colorado.

In 1955 and 1956, he was a Fulbright lecturer at the Tokyo University of Foreign Studies.

From 1963 Atherton served as Dean of Faculty and a professor of English at Claremont Men's College, which is now known as Claremont McKenna College.

Pitzer College Founding President
Over a period of seventeen months he recruited students, faculty, and trustees and constructed Scott and Sanborn Halls in time for the fall 1964 semester. During the College's first year, students and faculty created the curriculum and the school's system of governance.

Under his tenure the campus grew from 150 students to 650.

He remained president of Pitzer College until June 1970.

Atherton returned to Claremont, California when he retired in 1985.

Literary works
His poems and short stories were published in magazines such as the Saturday Review, The New Yorker, and The Yale Review.

Other appointments
In 1968, he was appointed to the board of governors of the Otis College of Art and Design in Los Angeles, California.

Personal life
Atherton married Virginia Richards in 1941. They had three children; John, Thomas and Carol. Atherton died on October 30, 2001, at the age of 85.

Legacy
Atherton was honored in 2004 by the Pitzer College community with the opening of a new residence hall bearing his name.

The John W. Atherton Scholarship is available to seniors majoring in both English and World Literature when attending Pitzer College.

See also
 Pitzer College

References

1916 births
2001 deaths
Presidents of Pitzer College
Amherst College alumni
University of Chicago alumni
People from Minneapolis
United States Navy personnel of World War II
United States Navy officers
20th-century American academics